José Carmelo "Pempe" Ruiz Padilla Jr. (July 16, 1911 – June 18, 1979) was a Filipino actor who appeared in several dozen movies. He made his first movie in 1931.

Padilla also represented his country as a lightweight boxer during the 1932 Summer Olympics in Los Angeles, United States, in 1932 and the 1936 Summer Olympics in Berlin, Germany, in 1936. In 1932 he was eliminated in the first round of the lightweight class after losing his bout to eventual gold medalist Lawrence Stevens.

1932 Olympic results
José Padilla, was a Filipino lightweight boxer who competed at the 1932 Los Angeles Olympics.  He lost to Lawrence Stevens (South Africa) in the Round of 16.

Family
Padilla was born into a show business clan. His father José Padilla Sr. was the governor of Bulacan from 1928 to 1931, and his brother was Carlos Padilla and Roy Padilla. He was the uncle of Rudy Fernández and Robin Padilla. He married Arsenia Francisco, a famous actress, and they had six children: Zenaida, Jovy, Maria Edith, Pempe Jr. (José III), Og, and Joena. He was the great-uncle of Zsa Zsa Padilla.

Movie career
He made his first movie in 1931, a silent horror film called Ang Multo sa Libingan, also known as Ghost in the Cemetery. His second movie, Doctor Kuba (1933), was also successful in the Philippines; in it he played second only to the leading actor Don Dannon.  Padilla had already made approximately three dozen movies before the Japanese occupied Manila in 1942. He was paired with several screen sirens: for example in Ako'y Maghihintay (1938) he teamed up with his real-life wife Arsenia Francisco, in Arimunding-Munding (1939) with Carmen Rosales, in Bakya Mo Neneng (1947) with Rosa del Rosario, and in Kaaway ng Babae (1948) with Lilia Dizon.

Filmography
1931 – Ang Multo sa Libingan
1933 – Doctor Kuba
1934 – Mag-inang Mahirap
1934 – X3X
1934 – Liwayway ng Kalayaan
1935 - Ang Gulong ng Buhay
1935 - Kuwintas ng Himutok
1937 - Mga Pusong Dakila
1937 - Asahar at Kabaong
1937 - Huling Awit
1937 - Ilaw ng Langit
1937 - Bilanggo Habang Buhay
1938 - Ang Batang Tulisan  - Filippine Pictures
1938 - Kamay na Bakal - Filippine Pictures
1938 - El Secreto dela Confesion - Parlatone Hispano-Filipino
1938 - Celia at Balagtas - Excelsior Pictures
1938 - Ako'y Maghihintay  - Excelsior Pictures
1938 - Lihim na Pagsinta  - V.Valdez Pictures
1939 - Azucena - Excelsior Pictures
1939 - Naglahong Dambana
1940 - Lihim ng Kapatid  - Excelsior Pictures
1940 - Sa Dating Pugad
1940 - Ave Maria  - Excelsior Pictures
1940 - Magpakailan Man - Excelsior Pictures
1940 - Dating Sumpaan  - Excelsior Pictures
1941 - Carmen – Sampaguita Pictures Inc
1941 - Princesita  - Sampaguita Pictures Inc
1941 - Panibugho   - Sampaguita Pictures Inc
1941 - Pagsuyo  - Sampaguita Pictures Inc
1941 - Palikero  - Sampaguita Pictures Inc
1941 - Lolita  - Sampaguita Pictures Inc
1942 - Landas na Ginto  - Sampaguita Pictures Inc
1946 - OO Ako'y Espiya  - Sta.Maria Pictures
1946 - Probinsiyana  - Premiere Productions
1946 - Ulilang Watawat  - Sampaguita Pictures Inc
1947 - Ngayon at Kailanman - Premiere Productions
1947 - Bakya mo Neneng  - Premiere Productions
1947 - Bagong Sinderella  - Premiere Productions
1947 - Maling Akala  - LVN Pictures
1947 - Miss Philippines - LVN Pictures
1947 - Caprichosa  - Premiere Productions
1947 - Violeta  - LVN Pictures
1947 - Binatang Taring  - LVN Pictures
1947 - Romansa   - LVN Pictures
1948 - Kaaway ng Babae   - LVN Pictures
1948 - Perfidia - Premiere Productions
1948 - Pista sa Nayon - LVN Pictures
1948 - Maliit lamang ang Daigdig  - Premiere Productions
1948 - Labi ng Bataan  - Premiere Productions
1948 - Hiram na Pangalan  - Premiere Productions
1949 - Lihim na Bayani  - Premiere Productions
1949 - Ibigin mo Ako,  Lalaking Matapang  - LVN Pictures
1949 - Anak ng Panday - Premiere Productions
1949 - Halik sa Bandila  - Premiere Productions
1949 - Makabagong Pilipina  - LVN Pictures
1949 - Sipag ay Yaman  - LVN Pictures
1949 - Ronquillo  - Luis F. Nolasco Production
1949 - Hen. Gregorio del Pilar - LVN Pictures
1949 - Magdalena
1950 - Mutya ng Pasig  - LVN Pictures
1950 - Tatlong Balaraw - Premiere Productions
1950 - Ang Bombero  - LVN Pictures
1950 - Gulong ng Palad  - Premiere Productions
1950 - Punglo at Pag-ibig  - Premiere Productions
1951 - Sa Oras ng Kasal  - Premiere Productions
1951 - Bahay na Tisa  - Premiere Productions
1951 - Dahong Palay  - Premiere Productions
1951 - Walang Kapantay - Royal Films
1951 - Diego Silang  - Premiere Productions
1951 - Ang Aking Kahapon  - Tamaraw Pictures
1952 - Matador  - LVN Pictures
1952 - Ngipin sa Ngipin  - Maria Clara Pictures
1952 - Sawa sa Lumang Simboryo  - Premiere Productions
1953 - Maria Mercedes   - LVN Pictures
1953 - Rosa Villa  - Premiere Productions
1953 - Tianak  Cinema Technician Inc.
1953 - Itinakwil  - LVN Pictures
1953 - Kambal na Lihim  - LGS Production
1953 - Sa Hirap at Ginhawa - Maria Clara Pictures
1953 - Siga-Siga  - Balatbat-Flores Pictures
1953 - Huk sa Bagong Pamumuhay - LVN Pictures
1953 - May Karapatang Isilang  - Deegar Cinema Inc
1953 - Habang Buhay  - Manuel Vistan Jr Production
1954 - Ri-Gi-Ding  - People's Pictures
1954 - Sa Kabila ng Bukas  - Hermoso-Balatbat Production
1954 - Matandang Dalaga  Sampaguita Pictures
1954 - Basagulera  - Everlasting Pictures
1954 - Sex Gang - Deegar Cinema Inc
1954 - Batalyon Pilipino sa Korea  - Palanca Bros Production
1954 - Ginto sa Lusak  - Balatbat-Flores Productions
1954 - Limang Misteryo  - Continental Pictures
1955 - Palahamak  - Premiere Productions
1955 - Minera  - Premiere Productions
1955 - Baril O Araro?  - Filipiniana Pictures
1955 - Sapagka't Mahal Kita  - Fremel Production
1955 - Ha Cha Cha  - People's Pictures
1955 - Pangako ng Puso  - Larry Santiago Productions
1955 - Paltik  - Premiere Production
1955 - Sanda Wong  - Manuel Vistan Production/Champion Ho Production
1955 - Dakilang Hudas  - People's Pictures
1956 - Takya  - Balatbat & Balatbat Productions
1956 - Ambrocia - Larry Santiago Productions
1956 - Hokus-Pokus  - People's Pictures
1956 - Lalo Kitang Mahal - People's Pictures
1956 - Umaalong Ginto  - Premiere Productions
1956 - Huling Mandirigma  - People's Pictures
1957 - Kandilang Bakal - Champion Pictures
1957 - Objective: Patayin si Magsaysay - Champion Pictures
1958 - Water Lily  - Premiere Productions
1958 - Obra-Maestra (segment "Macao") - People's Pictures
1958 - Isang paa sa hukay
1959 - Ramona
1959 - Kamandag
1959 - Tough Guy
1960 - Cuatro Cantos
1961 - Tacio
1961 - Pantalan Trece
1961 - Asiong Salonga
1961 - North Harbor
1962 - Digmaan ng mga Maton
1962 - Bulilit Al Capone
1963 - The Macapagal Story
1963 - Sigaw ng Digmaan
1963 - Kayo ang Humatol
1963 - God Knows (Batid ng Diyos)
1963 - Istambay
1963 - Si Darna at ang Impakta
1964 - Ging
1964 - Pamatay:Kaliwa at Kanan...!
1965 - Genghis Bond: Agent 1-2-3
1966 - Operation Butterball
1966 - Dolpong Scarface - RVQ Productions
1966 - Ako'y Magbabalik!
1966 - Ito ang Pilipino - EMAR Pictures
1967 - Kardong Kaliwa
1968 - Ngayon Lamang Ako Dumalangin
1968 - Mine Hunter
1969 - Rowena
1969 - Perlas ng Silangan - FPJ Productions
1969 - Mekeni's Gold
1969 - Dalawang Daigdig ni Carlota
1969 - Adriana
1970 - Inside Job
1970 - Omar Cassidy and the Sandalyas Kid
1970 - I Do Love You
1970 - Agent Silencer at Ang Pitong Brassieres
1970 - Memories of Our Dream
1970 - Renee Rose
1971 - Toro! Tora! Toray!
1971 - Guadalupe
1971 - Digmaan ng mga Angkan
1971 - Currimao
1972 - Ang Alamat
1973 - Florinda - FPJ Productions
1974 - Batingaw

References
 
 
 Biography of José Padilla Jr.

External links
 

1911 births
1978 deaths
People from Plaridel, Bulacan
20th-century Filipino male actors
Boxers at the 1932 Summer Olympics
Boxers at the 1936 Summer Olympics
Filipino male boxers
Lightweight boxers
Olympic boxers of the Philippines
Jose Jr.